John H. Edelmann (1852–1900) was a socialist-anarchist who worked as an architect in the office of Alfred Zucker, a successful commercial architect of the 1880s and 1890s in  New York City. As an architect, Edelmann's sole surviving monument is the former headquarters of the Decker Brothers Piano Company, the Decker Building (1893), at 33 Union Square West, New York. Louis Sullivan was influenced by his work with Edelmann and credits Edelmann's concept of "suppressed function" with the inspiration for his maxim, "Form follows function," a watchword of Modernism.

Before coming to New York, Edelmann had worked as a draughtsman for the Chicago architects William LeBaron Jenney and Dankmar Adler. It was Edelmann who introduced the young Louis Sullivan to Adler, with whom he formed a partnership. The late Prof. Donald Egbert of Princeton indicates that Edelmann came to New York in 1886 to work in the mayoral campaign of Henry George, the most influential proponent of the "Single Tax" on land, also known as the land value tax. Edelmann worked in the offices of Alfred Zucker from 1891 to 1893.
 
The Socialist Labor Party expelled him for his outspoken anarchist ideas, and so he and a group of anarchists founded a Socialist League in 1892. He was on hand to welcome the Russian anarchist Peter Kropotkin on his first lecture tour in America; Kropotkin stayed in the Edelmann apartment on East 96th Street during his stay. Edelmann had married Rachelle Krimont, an Eastern European immigrant whose family were radicals. In 1893 he, Francesco Saverio Merlino an Italian lawyer, anarchist activist and theorist of libertarian socialism, and other radicals published an anarchist journal Solidarity, and after it folded his contributed articles to The Rebel, published in Boston. These activities brought him into the circle of the eminent American anarchist and writer Emma Goldman.

Edelmann died during the heat wave of July 1900. His widow took their children to England and brought them up at Whiteway Colony.

Notes

1852 births
1900 deaths
19th-century American architects
American anarchists
19th-century American journalists
American male journalists
19th-century American male writers